Carabus albrechti echigo is a subspecies of ground beetle in the family Carabidae that is endemic to Japan.

References

albrechti echigo
Beetles described in 1996
Endemic fauna of Japan